The Papercut Chronicles II is the fifth and final studio album by American rap rock band Gym Class Heroes. It was released through Decaydance Records, Warner Bros. Records and Fueled by Ramen on November 15, 2011. It serves as a sequel to the group's second album, The Papercut Chronicles (2005). The album has sold 88,000 copies in the United States.

Singles
 The album's lead single, "Stereo Hearts" featuring Adam Levine from Maroon 5 was released for download via iTunes on June 14, 2011. It peaked at number 4 on the US Billboard Hot 100 chart.
 The album's second single, "Ass Back Home" featuring Neon Hitch was released for download via iTunes on October 31, 2011.
 The album's third single, "The Fighter" featuring Ryan Tedder of OneRepublic was released on November 8, 2011.
 The album's fourth single, "Martyrial Girls" was released on August 27, 2012.

Promotional singles
 The album's first and only promotional single, "Life Goes On" featuring Oh Land was released for download via iTunes on October 18, 2011.

Critical reception

Reception of The Papercut Chronicles II has been mixed. Kyle Anderson of Entertainment Weekly opined that while the album "too often chokes on revved-up aggro crunch and laughable lyrical raging against the machine, it works when they jettison their limp rap-rock instincts and plunge into crossover pop like the haunting 'Life Goes On' and stealthily sincere 'Ass Back Home'." Gregory Heaney of AllMusic noted that The Papercut Chronicles II will come as a "blast from the past" for the band's fans, adding that songs such as "Lazarus, Ze Gitan" and "Solo Discotheque (Whiskey Bitness)" feature the "infectious and highly polished sound that has made the quartet the pop/rap/punk crossover triple threat that it's grown into over the years." In a highly negative review of the record, Jody Rosen of Rolling Stone gave the record one and a half stars out of five, calling it "the year's most charmless album" and referring to McCoy as a "laughably inept MC".

Track listing
The track listing for all versions of The Papercut Chronicles II is as follows:

 The song "Kid Nothing and the Never-Ending Naked Nightmare" itself ends at 3:53.  There is then a few minutes of silence, then at 7:07 a hidden track outro starts, which involves a computerized voice asking what the listener thought about the album, then going off into random tangents.

Charts

Release history

References

2011 albums
Gym Class Heroes albums
Albums produced by Benny Blanco
Albums produced by Emile Haynie
Albums produced by Ryan Tedder
Sequel albums
Fueled by Ramen albums
Warner Records albums